Tal Gilboa is an Israeli animal liberation and vegan activist. In 2013, she founded the Israeli Animal Liberation Front, renamed ‘Total Liberation’ in 2018. Gilboa won HaAh HaGadol 6, the sixth season of the Israeli version of the reality show Big Brother.

During 2019, Gilboa joined the Likud party but was not selected to be part of the Knesset. She was appointed by prime minister Netanyahu as advisor on animal rights issues.

See also
 List of animal rights advocates

References

External links

1978 births
Living people
Animal welfare and rights in Israel
Big Brother (franchise) winners
Israeli animal rights activists
Israeli Jews
Israeli people of Romanian-Jewish descent
Israeli veganism activists
Jewish activists